Expressive language disorder is a communication disorder in which there are difficulties with verbal and written expression. It is a specific language impairment characterized by an ability to use expressive spoken language that is markedly below the appropriate level for the mental age, but with a language comprehension that is within normal limits. There can be problems with vocabulary, producing complex sentences, and remembering words, and there may or may not be abnormalities in articulation.

Careful diagnosis is also important because "atypical language development can be a secondary characteristic of other physical and developmental problems that may first manifest as language problems".

Models of language production

Willem Levelt outlined the currently accepted theory of speech production. Words are produced after the concept waiting to be produced is conceptualized, related words are selected, encoded and the sound waves of speech are produced.

Association with language networks
There is also a lot of debate about whether specific language impairments, such as expressive language disorder, are caused by deficits in grammar or by a deficit in processing language information. However, an alternative hypothesis to the cause of SLIs has been posited, called the Procedural Deficit Hypothesis. The Procedural Deficit Hypothesis opines that we can explain language impairments due to abnormal development of brain structures that are involved in procedural memory, our memories that remember how to perform different cognitive and motor tasks. The procedural memory system is associated with basal-ganglia circuits in the frontal lobe and further investigation of this particular hypothesis could aid in the development of a clinical neurological picture of what the underlying causes of SLI are.

Scientific studies of speech and language
Some of the earliest neuroscientific discoveries were related to the discovery that damage to certain areas of the brain related to impairments in language, such as the discovery of Wernicke's area and Broca's area. Lesions in these parts of the brain impair language comprehension and language production, respectively. Paul Broca was the first to note that the left hemisphere of the brain appeared to be localized for language function, particularly for right handed patients. Modern neuroscientific research has verified this, though language may be lateralizaed to the right hemisphere in some right-handed individuals.

Developmental verbal dyspraxia
In 1990, it was reported that the several generations of the KE family had developmental verbal dyspraxia and orofacial praxis that were inherited in a typical autosomal dominant pattern. Further analysis traced this inheritance pattern back to mutations in the FOXP2 genes. These studies have allowed scientists to begin to investigate how changes to one gene can alter human communication.

FOXP2 is the first gene that has been identified that is specifically linked to speech and language production. Mutant alleles of the normal FOXP2 gene have been found to be the cause of severe speech impairments.

Specific language impairment

Neuroimaging techniques, such as structural and functional MRI, found no significant differences between individuals with SLI and normal controls. However, more subtle and sophisticated techniques, such as voxel-based morphometry studies have allowed researchers to identify bilateral abnormalities in neural volume in areas of the brain associated with motor functions, such as the caudate nucleus, in the affected members of the KE family when compared to the unaffected family members. This volume reduction showed a high correlation between reduced volume and tests of oral praxis, supporting the idea that odd development of the caudate nucleus is related to the problems in motor control observed in the KE family.

Due to the vague nature of the diagnosis of expressive language disorder, there is little specific scientific research that we can currently locate. A larger body of research exists around neuroscientific studies with children diagnosed with a specific language impairment (SLI). fMRI studies have shown that children with SLI have a significantly smaller left hemispheric pars triangularis (Broca's area) and asymmetry of dominance of language structures, as opposed to the more typical left hemisphere dominance. Scientists are beginning to elucidate differences in activation patterns in children with SLIs using neuroimaging techniques to capture brain activity while performing different cognitive tasks. A major observation is lack of left hemisphere lateralization in major language structures such as the inferior frontal gyrus-opercularis, inferior frontal gyrus-triangularis, supramarginal gyrus and superior temporal gyrus. The same study reported hypoactivation and hyper activation of other brain regions - the supramarginal junction and anterior insula, respectively. Other in-depth imaging studies report finding previously undiagnosed lesions in the brains of children with well-characterized developmental language development. Together, these findings strongly suggest that language impairments are the result of an underlying neurological defect in an area of the brain related to language.

Studies looking at long-term outcomes for individuals with specific language impairments such as expressive language disorder track these individuals from childhood to adulthood. As Whitehouse and his colleagues  suggest, "When childhood language problems persist into adulthood, they can have far reaching consequences in terms of academic, social and vocational outcomes." These researchers found that children diagnosed with an SLI would have persistent problems with language and are more likely to pursue vocational training rather than university, thereby avoiding professions requiring high levels of literacy. A lower socioeconomic status was also noted by adults who were diagnosed with an SLI as a child. Whitehouse  also reported that these adults had more difficulties in establishing friendships, most likely due to a decreased ability to express themselves socially.

Current educational interventions for students with an SLI
Specific language impairments are often secondary characteristics of other disorders such as autism spectrum disorder and attention deficit hyperactivity disorder. In these cases, issues with speech and language are often not treated specifically, but rather attention is given to the primary complaint. Due to the high correlation of an SLI with other disorders, it is difficult to tell the difference between "pure SLI" or language impairments due to the presence of another disorder.

See also 
 Auditory processing disorder
 Speech-Language Pathology
 Mixed receptive-expressive language disorder

References

Further reading

External links 

Specific developmental disorders
Communication disorders